Williams Peak may refer to:

United States
 Williams Peak (Alaska)
 Williams Peak, a peak in the Sierra Prieta range, Arizona

 Williams Peak (Colorado)
 Williams Peak (Clearwater County, Idaho)
 Williams Peak (Custer County, Idaho)
 Williams Peak (Valley County, Idaho)
 Williams Peak (Mineral County, Montana), a mountain in Mineral County, Montana

 Williams Peak, on Oklahoma State Highway 44

Other places
 Williams Peak (Antarctica)
 Williams Peak (British Columbia)

See also
 Williams Mountain Highpoint, Colorado